Abdolrasoul Zarrin (1941 - 1983) (in Persian: عبدالرسول زرین ) was an Iranian sniper in the Iran–Iraq War. Iranian sources claim he killed 700 Iraqi soldiers during the war.

According to Seyyed Ahmad Mousavi, his friend and Intelligence Commander of the Younis Diver Battalion of Imam Hussein army asked Zarrin how many persons did he shoot, and he said more than 3,000 persons, with 1769 of them being confirmed kills.  Jamejam newspaper agreed on this number.

According to Iranian News Agency, he was one of the best snipers in the World.

Early life 
Abdolrasoul Zarrin was born in 1941 in the Village Qaleh Gol around Dehdasht. At the age of 4, he lost his father and at the age of 6, he also lost his mother and was placed under the care of his uncle. 

As a teenager, he was able to find his paternal relatives in Isfahan and settle down with them for work and life. Abdul Rasool finally managed to set up a clothing store near the "Baba Ali Asgar" Mosque in Isfahan and start a family.

Zarrin started a family in Isfahan at the age of 20 and had 7 children. He built a house and a shop near the "Baba Ali Asgar" Mosque in Isfahan. His job at that time was selling clothes.

He was killed in the second phase of the operation Kheiber.

Titles 
Hussein Kharazi called him one-man Battalion, and the Iraqis called him Khomeini's hunter.

He was awarded the honorary rank of Brevet after his assassination.

Film 
A film based on his life has been produced by the Fatah Narrative Cultural Foundation with the original name of Hunter Hunter (which was later changed to Sniper), produced by Ebrahim Asghari and directed by Ali Ghaffari, in which Kambiz Dirbaz plays the main role.

The film entered the Simorgh Soda section of the 39th Fajr Film Festival, and Crystal Simorgh received the "Best Film from National Perspective".

References

External links 
14.  https://minevisam.com/بیوگرافی-رسول-زرین/ 

1941 births
1983 deaths
Iranian military personnel killed in the Iran–Iraq War
Military snipers